Mark Alexander Wynter-Blyth (15 August 1906 – 16 April 1963 Leysin, Switzerland) was an English schoolteacher and amateur naturalist who wrote one of the first field guides to the butterflies of the Indian region. He was also involved in censuses of the Asiatic lion at the Gir forest.

Wynter-Blyth was born at Harrow-on-the-Hill, Middlesex, studied at Sedbergh School, Yorkshire and Magdalene College, Cambridge. He took an interest in nature study while still a student and moved to India in 1936 to become a house master at Bishop Cotton School. He later became headmaster of the preparatory school and here his meeting with A E Jones, an amateur lepidopterist, made him interested in butterflies. In 1941 he moved to the Nilgiris to take up a position as headmaster at St. George's School in Ketti; the school, which had been first recognized by the Education Department of Madras as a free primary school, was raised to the status of a high school in 1944 during his tenure. During the war, he was called to service but found unfit for active service and declined a staff appointment. In 1946 he moved to Saurashtra as a private tutor and from 1948 to 1963 until his death, he was the principal of the Rajkumar College, Rajkot, a school founded and run by the Princely Order of Kathiawar. He died in Switzerland of coronary thrombosis on 16 April 1963.

His book, Butterflies of the Indian Region published by the Bombay Natural History Society in 1957 was very influential and for a long time the only handy guide to butterflies in India.

References

External links 

 Rajkumar College, Rajkot site  Rajkumar College, Rajkot  in Wikipedia
  Principal of the Rajkumar College, Rajkot - 1948-1963 by Lavkumar Khachar  see in edit mode
 When the Last Lion Roars: The Rise and Fall of the King of the Beasts  
 Bibliographie générale sur les monts Nilgiri de l'Inde du sud 1603-1996 By Paul Hockings:WYNTER-BLYTH, Mark Alexander 4494. 1943 XVII.— Note on Curetis Species at Kallar. JBNHS, 43: 671-72. 4495. 19 4 4 The Butterflies of the Nilgiris. JBNHS
 An educationalist who loved butterflies
 THE ASIATIC LIONS OF SASAN-GIR : The first modern day count of lions was done by Mark Alexander Wynter-Blyth, the Principal of Rajkumar College, Rajkot sometime between 1948 to 1963, probably early in his tenure see in edit mode
"WYNTER-BLYTH,Eileen Mary died 12th June 1989: wife of Mr Wynter-Blyth"
"Both sexes of the butterfly have tawny wings with veins marked with broad black; Wynter-Blyth, Mark Alexander (1957)"
 Gir National Park: The first modern day count of lions was done by Mark Alexander Wynter-Blyth, the principal of Rajkumar College, Rajkot and R.S. Dharmakumarsinhji sometime between 1948 and 1963, probably early in his tenure  see in edit mode

English naturalists
English entomologists
1906 births
1963 deaths
Deaths from coronary thrombosis
Naturalists of British India
People from Harrow on the Hill
Indian schoolteachers
20th-century Indian zoologists
20th-century naturalists
Members of the Bombay Natural History Society